The Shire of Adavale is a former local government area in the south-east of Queensland, Australia, centred on the town of Adavale. It existed from 1879 to 1930.

History
On 11 November 1879, the Murweh Division was created as one of 74 divisions within Queensland under the Divisional Boards Act 1879. On 5 February 1889, the western part of Murweh Division was separated to create the new Adavale Division.

The Adavale Divisional Board met for the first time on 26 May 1889 and Mr E. B. Learmouth was appointed chairman.

The divisional board hall and offices were constructed in Adavale in 1889.

With the passage of the Local Authorities Act 1902, the Adavale Division became the Shire of Adavale on 31 March 1903.

On 17 July 1930, the shire was abolished, and its region split between the new Shire of Quilpie, the Shire of Murweh, the Shire of Isisford and the Shire of Barcoo.

Chairmen

 1888 A. B. Learmouth 
 1899 Augustus Henry Pegler 
 1927: William Hazlett

Population
The population of the shire was:

References

External links
 

Former local government areas of Queensland
1879 establishments in Australia
1930 disestablishments in Australia